Gainsborough (1915–1945) was a British bred Thoroughbred racehorse who won the English Triple Crown in 1918 and became a superior sire.

Background

Gainsborough was a bay horse bred by his owner Lady James Douglas (1854–1941). The colt was named after the town of Gainsborough, Lincolnshire because his owner liked the sound of the name. Gainsborough was sired by Bayardo, who also sired the 1917 Triple Crown winner, Gay Crusader, and was out of Rosedrop, who won the 1910 Epsom Oaks and £9,809.
Gainsborough's damsire was St. Frusquin, who won nine races including the 1896 2,000 Guineas and £33,960. Galopin was duplicated in the third and fourth generations of Gainsborough’s pedigree. He was not a big horse but possessed very good conformation and a kind temperament. One commentator described him as a "horse that would stand a campaign on the Western Front with Sir Douglas Haig on his back." Gainsborough was quite mature when he was offered at the yearling sales but did not reach the reserve that was placed on his price.

Lady Douglas sent Gainsborough to trainer Alec Taylor, Jr.'s training centre in Manton, Wiltshire, to prepare for racing.

Racing record

1917: two-year-old season
As a two-year-old, Gainsborough made three starts at the Newmarket Racecourse , won the Autumn Stakes by two lengths, and was rated the third best juvenile of his generation.

1918: three-year-old season
Gainsborough won the 2,000 Guineas, marking the first time that a horse bred by a woman won one of the British Classic Races and the first time a Classic winner carried a woman's colours. He was ridden by jockey Joe Childs, who, to help the War effort, donated his winnings to his 4th Hussars regiment to which he was attached.

Following his win in the 2,000 Guineas, Gainsborough won the most prestigious race in England, The Derby, which was run at Newmarket owing to wartime restrictions. He then won the Gold Cup against older horses at a distance of just over two miles (3,219 metres) and in autumn won the September Stakes—a substitute race for the Doncaster St. Leger Stakes—by three lengths over a field including the Oaks winner My Dear and Prince Chimay to become the 13th U.K. Triple Crown Champion in history. Gainsborough finished second to Prince Chimay in the Jockey Club Stakes, after which he was retired.

Stud record
In 1920, Gainsborough was retired to Lady Douglas's newly established Harwood Stud horse breeding operation in northern Hampshire at Woolton Hill, near Newbury, Berkshire.

He had a notable stud career, becoming the leading sire in Great Britain & Ireland in 1932 and 1933. A breeding source for great stamina, he was the sire of a number of Classic Race winners including:
 Hyperion – won the 1933 Epsom Derby and St. Leger Stakes and a champion sire six times.
 Solario – winner of the 1925 St. Leger Stakes and the 1926 Ascot Gold Cup who was 1937's leading sire in England
 Singapore – won the 1930 St. Leger Stakes
 Orwell – won the 1930 2,000 Guineas and £29,251.

Gainsborough's daughters did not distinguish themselves on the track but were good broodmares, including:

 Gainsborough Lass was his best race mare, running third in the 1,000 Guineas and winning £7,984.
 Mah Iran, the dam of Migoli, who won £22,950.
 Mah Mahal, the dam of Mahmoud, who won the 1936 Epsom Derby and was the Leading sire in North America in 1946
 Una Cameron – dam of 1931 2,000 Guineas and Derby winner Cameronian
 Painted Vale – dam of 1949 1,000 Guineas and Epsom Oaks winner Musidora and Valerullah

Ownership change
In 1940, failing health forced Lady James Douglas to sell her Harwood Stud, including Gainsborough. Under an agreement with new owner Herbert Blagrave, Gainsborough remained there until his death in 1945. He is buried on the  Harwood property that was eventually renamed Gainsborough Stud in his honour and since 1981 has operated as Gainsborough Stud Management Ltd. under the ownership of Sheikh Maktoum bin Rashid Al Maktoum.

Assessment
In their book A Century of Champions, John Randall and Tony Morris placed Gainsborough at number 56 in a list of the world's 200 best horses of the 20th century.

See also
 List of historical horses

References

1915 racehorse births
1945 racehorse deaths
Racehorses bred in the United Kingdom
Racehorses trained in the United Kingdom
Triple Crown of Thoroughbred Racing winners
British Champion Thoroughbred Sires
British Champion Thoroughbred broodmare sires
Thoroughbred family 2-n
Chefs-de-Race
Epsom Derby winners
2000 Guineas winners
St Leger winners